The Pratt & Whitney F100 (company designation JTF22) is an afterburning turbofan engine manufactured by Pratt & Whitney that powers the F-15 Eagle and F-16 Fighting Falcon.

Development

In 1967, the United States Navy and United States Air Force issued a joint engine Request for Proposals (RFP) for the F-14 Tomcat and the FX, which became the parallel fighter design competition that led to the F-15 Eagle in 1970. This engine program was called the IEDP (Initial Engine Development Program) and was funded and managed out of the Aeronautical Systems Division (ASD) at Wright-Patterson AFB. Under ASD, a Systems Project Office Cadre was assigned to manage both the FX Aircraft and Engine definition phase. The Turbine Engine Division of the Air Force Propulsion Laboratory was employed in a support role to assist ASD Systems Engineering in evaluations of technical risks. Later upon selection of the F-15 the ASD engineering cadre became the F-15 Systems Project Office.

The IEDP was created to be a competitive engine design/demonstration phase followed with a down select to one winning engine design and development program.  General Electric and Pratt & Whitney were placed on contract for an approximately 18-month program with goals to improve thrust and reduce weight to achieve a thrust-to-weight ratio of 8.  At the end of the IEDP, General Electric and Pratt & Whitney submitted proposals for their engine candidates for the aircraft that had been selected in the FX Competition, the McDonnell Douglas F-15. The Pratt & Whitney proposal was selected as the winner and the engine was designated the F100. The Air Force would award Pratt & Whitney a contract in 1970 to develop and produce F100-PW-100 (USAF) and F401-PW-400 (USN) engines. The Navy would use the engine in the planned F-14B and the XFV-12 project but would cut back and later cancel its order after the latter's failure, and chose to continue to use the Pratt & Whitney TF30 engine from the F-111 in its F-14.

Design and variants
The F100 is a twin spool, axial flow, afterburning turbofan engine. It has a 3-stage fan driven by a two-stage low-pressure turbine and a 10-stage compressor driven by a two-stage high-pressure turbine.

F100-PW-100

Due to the advanced nature of engine stemming from ambitious performance goals, numerous problems were encountered in its early days of service including high wear, stalling and "hard" afterburner starts. These "hard" starts could be caused by failure of the afterburner to start or by extinguishing after start, in either case the large jets of jet fuel were lit by the engine exhaust resulting in high pressure waves causing the engine to stall; these stagnation stalls usually occurred at high Mach and high altitude, and could seriously damage the turbine if the condition was not corrected. The problems were partially contributed by pilots making much more abrupt throttle changes than previous fighters and engines due to the excess thrust available. Early problems were eventually solved by the development of the F100-PW-220 in the early 1980s, which the -100 could be upgraded to.

F100-PW-200
The F-16 Fighting Falcon entered service with the F100-200; compared to the -100, the -200 has some additional redundancies for single-engine reliability and almost identical thrust ratings. In particular, a "proximate splitter" was introduced on the -200 that reduced the severity of the high pressure waves from "hard" afterburner starts. This greatly reduced the rate of stagnation stalls, and the -200 on the F-16 saw much better reliability than the -100 on the F-15, although some of the issues from the -100 remained. Similarly, these problems were eventually solved by the F100-PW-220, which the -200 could be upgraded to as well.

F100-PW-220/220E
Due to the unsatisfactory reliability, maintenance costs, and service life of the F100-PW-100/200, Pratt & Whitney was eventually pressured into upgrading the engine to address these issues. The Air Force also began funding the General Electric F101 Derivative Fighter Engine, which eventually became the F110, as a competitor to the F100 to coerce more urgency from Pratt & Whitney. The result of Pratt & Whitney's improvement efforts was the F100-PW-220, which eliminates almost all stall-stagnations and augmentor instability issues from the -100 as well as doubling time between depot overhauls. Reliability and maintenance costs were also drastically improved, and the engine incorporates a digital electronic engine control (DEEC).

The F100-PW-220 was introduced in 1986 and was installed on the F-15 or F-16, gradually replacing the -100/200. Seeking a way to drive unit costs down, the USAF implemented the Alternative Fighter Engine (AFE) program in 1984, under which the engine contract would be awarded through competition; the -220 would be Pratt & Whitney’s initial offering in the AFE program, competing with the General Electric F110-GE-100. The F-16C/D Block 30/32s were the first to be built with the common engine bay, able to accept the existing F100-200/220 engine (Block 32) or the F110-100 (Block 30). A non-afterburning variant, the F100-PW-220U powers the Northrop Grumman X-47B UCAV. The -100 and -200 series engines could be upgraded to become equivalent to -220 specifications; the "E" abbreviation from 220E is for “equivalent” and given to engines which have been upgraded as such.

F100-PW-229
The F100-PW-229 and its competitor, the General Electric F110-GE-129, were the result of the USAF seeking greater power for its tactical aircraft through the Improved Performance Engine (IPE) program in the 1980s; in addition to greater thrust, the -229 incorporates the reliability and durability improvements of the -220 as well as an enhanced DEEC. Compared to earlier variants, the -229 has a higher turbine inlet temperature, higher airflow, and lower bypass ratio. The -229 powers late model F-16C/D Block 52s and F-15Es.

A variant of the -229 fitted with a 3-dimensional axisymmetric thrust vectoring nozzle, referred by Pratt & Whitney as the Pitch/Yaw Balance Beam Nozzle (P/YBBN), was tested on the F-15 ACTIVE (Advanced Control Technology for Integrated Vehicles) in the 1990s.

In 2007, the F100-PW-229EEP (Engine Enhancement Package) began development to increase reliability and number of accumulated cycles between depot overhauls. This was done by applying technology from the F100-PW-232 (see below), which in turn incorporated technology and advancements from the F119 program for the F-22, as well as (for -229EEP) from the F135 program for the F-35; the -229EEP incorporates updated turbine materials, cooling management techniques, compressor aerodynamics, split cases (top and bottom) and updated DEEC software. Deliveries of the -229EEP began in 2009.

F100-PW-232
The F100-PW-232, originally called F100-PW-229A (Advanced), was a further enhanced variant that incorporated engineering advances and technology from Pratt & Whitney’s F119 engine for the F-22 as well as operational experience from the -229; development began in the late 1990s. The fan was larger for increased airflow and redesigned to be more reliable; it incorporated stages with the blades and disk formed into a single piece called an integrally-blades rotor (IBR), or blisk. The stators were also redesigned for better aerodynamics to improve stall margin. The -232 was not pursued by the USAF, but many of the improvements were incorporated into the -229EEP to increase its reliability and inspection intervals.

Derivatives

The F401 was the naval development of the F100 and designed in tandem. It was intended to power the F-14B Tomcat and Rockwell XFV-12, but the engine was canceled due to costs and development issues. The PW1120 turbofan was a smaller derivative of the F100; it was installed as a modification to a single F-4E fighter jet, and powered the canceled IAI Lavi.

Applications

 General Dynamics F-16 Fighting Falcon (-200, -220, -229)
 McDonnell Douglas F-15 Eagle (-100, -220)
 McDonnell Douglas F-15E Strike Eagle (-220, -229)
 Northrop Grumman X-47B (-220U)
 Vought YA-7F

Specifications (F100)

F100-PW-220

F100-PW-229

See also

References

Bibliography

External links

 F100 page on Pratt & Whitney's site
 F100-PW-100/-200 page on GlobalSecurity.com
 F100 page on LeteckeMotory.cz (cs)

Low-bypass turbofan engines
F100
1970s turbofan engines